Mady Correll (1907 – 1981) was a Canadian-American actress. She made her screen debut in Midnight Madonna after years on Broadway theatre and later starred in Monsieur Verdoux.

Career
Correll acted in various Broadway theatre shows including Springtime for Henry, June Moon, Too Much Party, and Sweet Mystery of Life. She was eventually recruited to make her screen debut in the 1937 drama Midnight Madonna. 

She also starred in Charlie Chaplin's film Monsieur Verdoux and George Archainbaud's Texas Masquerade. In 1948, she appeared in the Putnam County Playhouse's production of Secret Service.

Filmography

References

External link

1907 births
1981 deaths
Canadian film actresses
Canadian stage actresses
American film actresses
American stage actresses
20th-century American actresses
20th-century American people
Canadian emigrants to the United States